Life in the Tropics is the 11th album by the American Jazz group The Rippingtons. It was released in 2000, and was the group's first release for Peak label. The album reached No. 3 on Billboard's contemporary jazz chart.

Track listing
All tracks written by Russ Freeman except as noted.
"Club Paradiso" – 4:23
"Caribbean Breeze" – 4:23
"Cruisin' Down Ocean Drive" – 4:38
"Be Cool" – 4:25
"Rhythm of Your Life" – 4:00
"Love Child" – 4:20
"Avenida del Mar" – 5:17
"I Found Heaven" – 4:24
"South Beach Mambo" – 4:47
"Life in the Tropics" – 4:56
"Island Aphrodisiac" – 4:41

Personnel 

The Rippingtons
 Russ Freeman – keyboards, acoustic guitar, classical guitar, bass (1, 4, 5, 11), rhythm programming, vocals (9)
 David Kochanski – keyboards
 Kim Stone – bass (2, 3, 6, 7, 9, 10)
 David Hooper – drums (1-5, 7, 9, 10, 11), vocals (9)

Guest Musicians
 Bill Heller – acoustic piano (3, 7), keyboards (5, 6), arrangements (5), rhythm programming (6)
 Gary Brown – keyboards (8), bass (8), rhythm programming (8), backing vocals (8)
 Bob James – keyboards (10)
 Peter White – classical guitar (2)
 Ramon Yslas – percussion (2-5, 7, 9, 10, 11)
 Mark Binder – additional programming (10)
 Eric Marienthal – saxophone (1, 10), tenor saxophone (6)
 Dave Koz – saxophone (4)
 Paul Taylor – alto saxophone (6)
 Bill Reichenbach, Jr. – trombone (5, 7, 9)
 Gary Grant – trumpet (5, 7, 9)
 Jerry Hey – trumpet (5, 7, 9)
 Ramon Flores – trumpet solo (9), trumpet (11)

Guest Vocalists
 Daisy Villa – lead vocals (5), backing vocals (5), vocals (9)
 Michael Angelo – backing vocals (5)
 Andi Howard – backing vocals (5)
 Howard Hewett – lead vocals (8)
 Laurie Hooper – vocals (9)

Production
 Russ Freeman – producer, executive producer, recording, mixing 
 Michael Angelo Salusberry – vocal producer (5)
 Gary Brown – producer (8)
 Andi Howard – executive producer, production manager, management 
 Alexis Davis – A&R
 Mark Binder – additional engineer 
 Ken Freeman – additional engineer
 Posie Muladi – additional engineer
 Nick Sodano – additional engineer
 Robert Hadley – mastering 
 Doug Sax – mastering 
 MAD Design – art direction 
 Bill Mayer – cover artwork
 David Hooper – studio photography

Studios
 Recorded at Swamp Rat Studios (Boca Raton, FL); Rumbo Recorders (Canoga Park, CA); Sapphire Sound (Las Vegas, NV); Remidi Studios (Dobbs Ferry, NY).
 Tracks 1-7, 9, 10 & 11 mixed at Swamp Rat Studios; Track 8 mixed at Sound On Sound Studios (New York, NY).
 Mastered at The Mastering Lab (Hollywood, CA).

Charts

References

External links
The Rippingtons-Life in the Tropics at CD Universe
The Rippingtons-Life in the Tropics at AllMusic
The Rippingtons Official Website

2000 albums
Peak Records albums
The Rippingtons albums